Adl is an Arabic word meaning 'justice', and is also one of the names of God in Islam. It is equal to the concept of Insaf انصاف (lit. sense of justice) in the Baháʼí Faith.

Adil, and Adeel are male names derived from ʻadl and are common throughout the Muslim world.

In Islamic jurisprudence 

Adl, as used by early theorists of Islamic jurisprudence, referred to an aspect of an individual's character. This aspect is best translated as probity.  
Although Adl, as used by many religious scholars today, is loosely used as meaning solely justice, one must look more closely at how and why religious scholars choose to use this word.
In a hadith, Islamic prophet Muhammad said that, the meaning of wasat (moderation) is adl (justice).

In Islamic theology 
Adl is another word for divine justice in Islam. The conception of this term varies between Shias and Sunnis. For Shias, divine justice is one of the Usul ad-Din. Shias tend to believe that God is rationally just, that men inherently know the difference between good and evil, and that we have complete free will. Sunnis, in contrast, believe that God is necessarily just, that revelation, the Qur'an, is the only way to know good and evil, and that men are afforded some volition within predestination.

Family name 
The origin of the modern Persian family name Adl is from the titles of nobility given to Iranian jurists at the end of the 19th century, that were related by family ties. Notably, these jurists included Mirza Husain Noori Tabarsi, also known as "Hossein Shah", whose title was ʻAdl al-Mulk "Justice of the Kingdom", Sayyid Mirza Ebrahim Khalil, whose title was Rukn al-Idalah "Pillar of Justice", and Mirza Mostafa Khan Adl, whose title was Mansur al-Saltanah "Victorious of the Empire".

References

External links
How to Pronounce ʻAdl
Do you like your name

Arabic words and phrases
Islamic terminology
Names of God in Islam